The spectacled barwing (Actinodura ramsayi) is a species of bird in the family Leiothrichidae.

It is found in China, Laos, Myanmar, Thailand, and Vietnam.

Its natural habitat is subtropical or tropical moist montane forests.

References

Collar, N. J. & Robson C. 2007. Family Timaliidae (Babblers)  pp. 70 – 291 in; del Hoyo, J., Elliott, A. & Christie, D.A. eds. Handbook of the Birds of the World, Vol. 12. Picathartes to Tits and Chickadees. Lynx Edicions, Barcelona.

spectacled barwing
Birds of South China
Birds of Myanmar
Birds of Thailand
Birds of Laos
Birds of Vietnam
spectacled barwing
Taxonomy articles created by Polbot